Sidney Gilman is a retired physician, neurologist, and educator. He is an expert on Alzheimer's disease and spent the majority of his career at the University of Michigan, its medical school, and its Health System.

Early life, family and education
Gilman was raised in California. In 1950, he graduated from Huntington Park High School in Huntington Park, California.

He graduated from University of California, Los Angeles (UCLA) for his undergraduate degree in 1954 and its medical school in 1957, receiving the highest academic honors. During his college years, he was a gymnastics athlete.

He completed his medical residency at Boston City Hospital and a neurology fellowship at Harvard Medical School. He completed a neurophysiology fellowship from 1958 to 1960 at the National Institutes of Health in Bethesda, Maryland.

Career
Dr. Gilman taught at Harvard Medical School after he completed his research fellowship. He worked at the National Institutes of Health and performed authoritative research regarding brain control of motor functions and muscle tone. He began working at Columbia University in 1968, and in 1976 he was named the first H. Houston Merritt chair in research neurology. In 1977, however, he became professor, chair and chief of service of neurology at the University of Michigan Medical School. The hospital's neurology service named after him, as well as a lecture series. He published hundreds of articles and delivered decades of lectures. His university salary eventually was over US$300,000.

His research and areas of interest have involved brain and spinal cord injury, neurological degenerative diseases, and the effects of alcohol on the brain, R.E.M. sleep disorders, Parkinson's disease and Lewy body disease, and cardiac denervation among many other subjects. Some of his research has been in connection with many of the world's largest pharmaceutical companies, including Merck, Pfizer, and Johnson & Johnson. In the 2000s, he also worked as a consultant for Wall Street investors including Pequot Capital and Longitude Capital. These jobs increased Gilman's income by more than US$200,000 per year.

Gilman has held numerous editorial and advisory board positions with major scientific publications, including Neurology, Journal of Neuropathology and Experimental Neurology, Applied Neurophysiology, Experimental Neurology, Annals of Neurology, Neurobiology of Disease, and Alzheimer Disease & Associated Disorders.

Bapineuzumab controversy 
In 2013, Gilman was implicated in the insider trading scandal concerning the Alzheimer's medication bapineuzumab, a drug which was being developed by Wyeth and Élan. In exchange for lighter punishment, Gilman agreed to testify and implicate Mathew Martoma of CR Intrinsic, a company affiliated with the hedge fund SAC Capital Advisors. It was considered "the most lucrative insider trading scheme in history." Gilman served no prison time and returned his earnings with interest.

As a result, the University of Michigan disassociated itself from him.

Personal life
Gilman and his first wife Linda had two sons, Jeff and Todd. The marriage ended in divorce. Jeff, like his paternal grandmother, committed suicide.
 
In 1984 Sid Gilman married Carol Barbour, a psychoanalyst.

After being diagnosed with lymphoma, he received chemotherapy treatment successfully.

Honors and awards

 1972: Elected Member, The American Society for Clinical Investigation
 1973: Lucy G. Moses Prize in Basic Neurology
 1981: United Cerebral Palsy Weinstein-Goldenson Award for Medical Research for Cerebral Palsy and the Physically Handicapped
 1986–88: President, Michigan Neurological Association
 1988–89: President, American Neurological Association
 1992: Professional Achievement Award from UCLA Alumni Association
 1995: Elected Member, Institute of Medicine
 1999 Fellow, American Association for the Advancement of Science
 2000 Fellow, Royal Society of Medicine
 2001 Fellow, Royal College of Physicians
 2001 Fellow, American Academy of Arts and Sciences
 2005: Distinguished University Professorship, University of Michigan Rackham Graduate School
 2010: Medical Center Alumni Society Distinguished Achievement Award, University of Michigan

Publications

References

External links
 Sid Gilman profile at University of Michigan Health System (archived)
 Curriculum Vitae of Sid Gilman at annarbor.com

American neurologists
Alzheimer's disease researchers
University of Michigan faculty
University of Michigan staff
1932 births
Living people
Harvard Medical School alumni
University of California, Los Angeles alumni
Members of the National Academy of Medicine